Ramakrishna Hegde ministry was the Council of Ministers in Karnataka, a state in South India headed by Ramakrishna Hegde of the Janata Party.

The ministry had multiple  ministers including the Chief Minister. All ministers belonged to the JP.

After Janata Party won the 1983 Karnataka elections and Ramakrishna Hegde was elected as Janata Legislative Party leader. He took charge as Chief Minister of the State on 10 January 1983 and his was in power till he resigned on 29 December 1984. Later he was sworn in as Chief Minister on 8 March 1985 after winning 1985 Karnataka elections

Chief Minister and Cabinet Ministers

Minister of State

Leader of the House 
Legislative Assembly - Ramakrishna Hegde (Chief minister)
Legislative Council - Abdul Nazir Sab (Minister of Rural development, Panchayat Raj and Wakf)

See also 

 Karnataka Legislative Assembly

References 

Cabinets established in 1983
1983 establishments in Karnataka
1984 disestablishments in India
Hegde
Hegde
Cabinets disestablished in 1984
1983 in Indian politics